Personology may refer to:

 A theory of personality psychology advanced by Henry Murray and others
 Physiognomy, the assessment of a person's character or personality from outer appearance, especially the face